Beloveža is a village and municipality in Bardejov District, in the Prešov Region of north-east Slovakia.

History
In historical records the village was first mentioned in 1355. The Catholic church of St. Michael the Archangel of 1778 can be found in the village.

Geography
The municipality lies at an altitude of 290 metres and covers an area of 10.153 km². It has a population of about 785 people, 703 Slovaks and 82 Ruthenians, mostly members of the Greek Catholic Church.

Genealogical resources

The records for genealogical research are available at the state archive "Statny Archiv in Presov, Slovakia"

 Roman Catholic church records (births/marriages/deaths): 1750-1896 (parish B)
 Greek Catholic church records (births/marriages/deaths): 1753-1906 (parish A)

See also
 List of municipalities and towns in Slovakia

References

External links
 
 
https://web.archive.org/web/20070427022352/http://www.statistics.sk/mosmis/eng/run.html
Surnames of living people in Beloveza

Villages and municipalities in Bardejov District
Šariš